Fisheye is a revision-control browser and search engine owned by Atlassian, Inc. Although Fisheye is a commercial product, it is freely available to open source projects and non-profit institutions. In addition to the advanced search and diff capabilities, it provides:
 the notion of changelog and changesets - even if the underlying version control system (such as CVS) does not support this
 direct, resource-based URLs down to line-number level
 monitoring and user-level notifications via e-mail or RSS

Use in open-source projects
Atlassian approves free licenses for community and open-source installations under certain conditions. Many major open source projects use Fisheye to provide a front-end for the source code repository:

Atlassian provides free licences of Fisheye and Crucible for open-source projects.

Integration
 Fisheye supported integration with the following revision control systems: 
 CVS
 Git
 Mercurial
 Perforce
 Subversion

Due to the resource-based URLs, it is possible to integrate Fisheye with different issue and bug tracking systems. It also provides a REST and XML-RPC API. Fisheye also integrates with IDEs like IntelliJ IDEA via the Atlassian IDE Connector.

See also
 Crucible
 OpenGrok
 Source code repository
 Trac
 ViewVC

References

External links
 , the software's official website
Atlassian products
Browsers
Proprietary cross-platform software
Version control systems
Java (programming language) software
2019 software